Jamaican Americans are an ethnic group of Caribbean Americans who have full or partial Jamaican ancestry. The largest proportions of Jamaican Americans live in South Florida and New York City, both of which have been home to large Jamaican communities since the 1950s and 60s. There are also communities of Jamaican Americans residing in Connecticut, Georgia, New Jersey, Pennsylvania, Maryland, Massachusetts, and California. 

The vast majority of Jamaican Americans are of black African-Caribbean descent, and many are also some of full or partial Indian Jamaican, Chinese Jamaican, European and Lebanese descent.

Historical immigration 
After 1838, European colonies in the Caribbean with expanding sugar industries imported large numbers of immigrants to meet their acute labor shortage. Large numbers of Jamaicans were recruited to work in Panama and Costa Rica in the 1850s. After slavery was abolished in the United States in 1865, American planters imported temporary workers, called "swallow migrants", to harvest crops on an annual basis. These workers, many of them Jamaicans, returned to their countries after harvest. Between 1881 and the beginning of World War I, the United States recruited over 250,000 workers from the Caribbean, 90,000 of whom were Jamaicans, to work on the Panama Canal. During both world wars, the United States again recruited Jamaican men for service on various American bases in the region.

Significant immigration waves

Jamaican immigration to the U.S. increased during the civil rights era of the 1960s. As with many other sources of Caribbean immigration, the geographical nearness of Jamaica to the U.S. increased the likelihood of migration. The economic attractiveness and general Jamaican perception of the U.S. as a land of opportunity explain continued migration flows despite economic downturn in America. Traditionally, America has experienced increased migration through means of family preference, in which U.S. citizens sponsor their immediate family. Through this category a substantial amount of Jamaican immigrants were able to enter mainly urban cities within the U.S that provided blue-collar work opportunities. Jamaican immigrants utilized employment opportunities despite the discriminatory policies that affected some Caribbean émigrés.

Jamaicans comprise the largest nationality of U.S. immigrants from the English-speaking Caribbean. Because so many have assimilated into the black community, it is difficult to estimate their number. The 1990 U.S. census placed the number of documented Jamaican Americans at 435,025.

Demographics
An estimated 554,897 Jamaican-born people lived in the U.S. in 2000. This represents 61% of the approximate 911,000 Americans of Jamaican ancestry. Many Jamaicans are second, third and descend from even older generations, as there have been Jamaicans in the U.S. as early as the early twentieth Century. The regional composition is as follows: 59 percent live in the Northeast, mainly in the State of New York; 4.8 percent in the Midwest; 30.6 percent in the South, particularly South Florida; and 5.6 percent on the West. The New York metropolitan area and South Florida have the largest number of Jamaican immigrants in the United States. South Florida is home to the highest number of undocumented Jamaicans, whereas most documented immigrants tend to reside in Brooklyn. Jamaicans refer to Miami metropolitan area and Brooklyn colloquially as "Kingston 21" and "Little Jamaica" respectively. Jamaicans in the Miami metropolitan area mostly live in Broward County and Jamaicans in New York City have formed communities in Brooklyn, The Bronx and Queens. Especially Central Brooklyn, particularly East Flatbush, Crown Heights, Brownsville, Flatbush, Flatlands and Canarise and the Northeast Bronx, particularly Wakefield and Williamsbridge neighborhoods holding the largest Jamaican populace. Large communities of Jamaican immigrants have formed in New York City and the whole New York Metro Area, which includes Long Island and much of New Jersey and Connecticut, along with Florida (centered in and around the Miami/Broward County, Orlando and Tampa areas), which has the second largest Jamaican community in the U.S. In recent years, many Jamaicans have left New York City for its suburbs, and large Jamaican communities have also formed in many other major cities like Philadelphia (including Delaware and other parts of eastern Pennsylvania), Baltimore, Washington D.C./Central Maryland, Atlanta, Boston, Western NY State (Buffalo and Rochester) and Cleveland. Smaller numbers are in Charlotte, Houston, Chicago and Los Angeles.

U.S. states with large Jamaican populations 
According to the 2010 U.S. Census, there were 965,355 Jamaican Americans. 

The 10 U.S. states with the largest Jamaican populations in 2019 are:
 New York – 307,464
 Florida – 304,617
 Georgia – 67,818
 New Jersey – 67,143
 Connecticut – 56,248
 Maryland – 40,534
 Pennsylvania – 39,518
 Texas – 38,763
 Massachusetts – 36,333
 California – 36,092

U.S. metropolitan areas with largest Jamaican populations
The top 10 U.S. metropolitan areas with the largest populations of Jamaicans (Source: 2019 American Community Survey 1-Year Estimates)

 New York-Northern New Jersey-Long Island, NY-NJ-PA-CT MSA – 332,681
 Miami-Fort Lauderdale-Pompano Beach, FL MSA – 173,277
 Atlanta-Sandy Springs-Marietta, GA MSA – 59,097
 Orlando-Kissimmee-Sanford, FL MSA – 42,922
 Washington-Arlington-Alexandria, DC-VA-MD-WV MSA – 39,253
 Philadelphia-Camden-Wilmington, PA-NJ-DE-MD MSA – 32,934
 Hartford-East Hartford-Middletown, CT MSA – 29,530
 Boston-Cambridge-Quincy, MA-NH MSA – 21,510
 Tampa-St. Petersburg-Clearwater, FL MSA – 18,546
 Bridgeport-Stamford-Norwalk, CT MSA – 16,822

U.S. communities with high percentages of people of Jamaican ancestry
The top 25 U.S. communities with the highest percentage of people claiming Jamaican ancestry are:

 Blue Hills, Connecticut (neighborhood) 23.9%
 Lauderdale Lakes, Florida 18.8%
 Lauderhill, Florida 17.6%
 South Floral Park, New York 15.5%
 Miramar, Florida 15.40%
 Bloomfield, Connecticut and Mount Vernon, New York 12.9%
 Lakeview, New York 12.7%
 North Lauderdale, Florida 11.1%
 Uniondale, New York 11.0%
 El Portal, Florida 8.5%
 Roosevelt, New York 8.2%
 Pembroke Park, Florida 8.0%
 North Valley Stream, New York and Hartford, Connecticut 7.90%
 Sunrise, Florida 7.60%
 Miami Gardens, Florida 6.3%
 North Amityville, New York 6.1%
 South Miami Heights, Florida 6.0%
 Hempstead, New York and Elmont, New York 5.9%
 Lake Park, Florida and Carol City, Florida 5.8%
 East Orange, New Jersey, Gordon Heights, New York, Ives Estates, Florida and Golden Glades, Florida 5.7%
 North Miami Beach, Florida 5.5%
 New Cassel, New York 5.30%
 Bronx, New York and Chillum, Maryland 5.2%
 Pembroke Pines, Florida and Wheatley Heights, New York 5.1%
 Bridgeport, Connecticut and Windsor, Connecticut 4.5%
 Orange, New Jersey and South Bay, Florida 4.3%
 Spring Valley, New York 4.2%
 Goulds, Florida, Tamarac, Florida and Royal Palm Beach, Florida 4.1%
 New Carrollton, Maryland, Plantation, Florida and Cottage City, Maryland 4%
 Mangonia Park, Florida, Redan, Georgia and Somerset, New Jersey 3.9%
 Brooklyn, New York, Naranja, Florida and Stone Mountain, Georgia 3.8%
 Mount Rainier, Maryland, Adelphi, Maryland, Pine Hills, Florida, Baldwin, New York and Poinciana, Florida 3.7%
 Westbury, New York and Inwood, New York 3.6%
 Paterson, New Jersey and Brentwood, Maryland 3.5%
 Teaneck, New Jersey 3.4%
 North Miami, Florida and Plainfield, New Jersey 3.3%
 Richmond West, Florida 3.2%
 Haverhill, Florida 3.1%
 Opa-Locka, Florida and Margate, Florida 3%

U.S. communities with the most residents born in Jamaica
Top 50 U.S. communities with the most residents born in Jamaica are:

 Sunrise, FL  19.6%
 Norland, FL 18.5%
 Blue Hills, CT 18.3%
 Lauderdale Lakes, FL 16.9%
 Andover, FL 15.0%
 Lauderhill, FL 14.8%
 Utopia, FL 13.1%
 Palmetto Estates, FL 12.6%
 Miramar, FL 12.5%
 Scott Lake, FL 12.3%
 South Floral Park, NY 12.1%
 Mount Vernon, NY 11.2%
 Bloomfield, CT 11.1%
 North Lauderdale, FL 9.7%
 Fort Devens, MA 9.3%
 Northwest Dade, FL 8.5%
 Uniondale, NY 8.2%
 St. George, FL 8.1%
 East Garden City, NY 7.7%
 El Portal, FL 7.5%
 Silver Springs Shores, FL 7.5%
 Washington Park, FL 7.2%
 North Valley Stream, NY 6.7%
 Sunrise, FL 6.6%
 Harlem, FL 6.4%
 Lakeview, NY 6.2%
 Opa-locka North, FL 6.1%
 Hartford, CT 6.0%
 Roosevelt, NY 5.9%
 Westview, FL 5.7%
 Tangelo Park, FL 5.5%
 Miami Gardens, Broward County, FL 5.5%
 Pembroke Park, FL 5.3%
 Lake Park, FL 5.2%
 Ives Estates, FL 5.1%
 North Amityville, NY 5.1%
 Canal Point, FL 5.1%
 Rock Island, FL 5.1%
 Boulevard Gardens, FL 5.0%
 North Miami Beach, FL 5.0%
 Lake Lucerne, FL 4.9%
 Golden Glades, FL 4.9%
 Broadview-Pompano Park, FL 4.8%
 Carol City, FL 4.7%
 East Orange, NJ 4.7%
 Pembroke Pines, FL 4.4%
 Stacy Street, FL 4.3%
 Mangonia Park, FL 4.3%
 Three Lakes, FL 4.2%
 Elmont, NY 4.2%

Total immigrant population from Jamaica according to ACS 2015-2019 estimates: 741,400; the top counties were: 

1) Broward County, Florida ------------------- 86,600

2) Brooklyn Borough, New York ----------- 62,200

3) Bronx Borough, New York ---------------- 49,400

4) Queens Borough, New York ------------- 49,000

5) Palm Beach County, Florida ------------- 26,900

6) Miami-Dade County, Florida ------------- 23,400

7) Westchester County,  New York ------- 18,200

8) Hartford County, Connecticut ---------- 17,100

9) Orange County,  Florida -------------------- 16,900

10) Nassau County, New York -------------- 16,600

11) Essex County, New Jersey ------------- 12,500

12) Fairfield County, Connecticut --------- 12,100

13) Prince George's Co., Maryland ------- 11,100

14) Philadelphia County, Penn. ------------ 10,100

15) Dekalb County, Georgia ------------------- 9,900

16) Suffolk County, Massachusetts ------- 8,200

17) Gwinnett County, Georgia ---------------- 7,500

18) Hillsborough County, Florida ------------ 7,300

19) Saint Lucie County, Florida -------------- 7,000

20) Suffolk County, New York ---------------- 6,800

21) New Haven County, Connecticut ------ 6,400

22) Los Angeles County,  California ------- 5,900

23) Cook County, Illinois ------------------------ 5,700

24) Harris County,  Texas ----------------------- 5,300

25) Bergen County, New Jersey ------------- 5,200

26) Manhattan Borough, New York -------- 5,100

27) Montgomery County, Maryland -------- 5,100

Socioeconomics

Age and English proficiency 
In 2014, the median age of Caribbean immigrants was 48 years, compared to 44 years for the general immigrant average. The median age of Jamaican immigrants was 49 years old. According to the Migration Policy Institute's tabulation of census data, 6% of Caribbean immigrants were under the age of 18, 76% between the ages of 18 and 64, and 19% were 65 and older.

In 2019, the median age of Jamaican Americans was 37 years old (U.S. Census Bureau 2019).

Caribbean immigrants are more likely to be proficient in English compared to the general immigrant population. In 2017, only 2% of Jamaicans were Limited English Proficient (LEP). By 2019, the figure had reduced to just 0.9% of Jamaicans who were LEP (U.S. Census Bureau 2019).

Education and employment 
Caribbean immigrants perform better than the general immigrant population in terms of high school graduation rates.

In 2017, 24% of Jamaican immigrants had a bachelor's degree. This was higher than the Caribbean average of 21% (compared to 31% in the general immigrant population).

In 2019, 30% of Jamaican Americans had a bachelor's degree. This is higher than the American average of 24.3% (U.S. Census Bureau 2019).

76% of Jamaican immigrants are working age (18 to 64). An estimated 30% of Caribbean immigrants are in the service occupations, 21% are in sales and office positions, and 25% are in management, business, science, and arts occupations and only 9% of Jamaican immigrants are in construction and maintenance jobs. Jamaicans specifically, 32-37% seek management, business, science, and arts positions. According to the Migration Policy Institute, Jamaican immigrants to the United States consistently compose of a high share of skilled professionals. Caribbean immigrants tend to have a higher employment participation rate than the American average.

Income 
In 2014, the median Jamaican immigrant yearly income was $51,000 with a 13% poverty rate. The median Jamaican immigrant income is higher than the average Caribbean immigrant income, which was about $41,000 with a 20% poverty rate. According to World Bank data, in 2014, the Caribbean as a whole was sent $9.7 billion, 8% of the US GDP as remittances, not including Cuba, which is estimated to send $1.8 billion. 

In 2019, Jamaican Americans had a median household income of $62,044, higher than the American average of $57,761. Jamaican Americans had a poverty rate of 11.2%, lower than the American average of 12% (U.S. Census Bureau 2019).

Homeownership 
Jamaican Americans have one of the highest rates of homeownership among Latin American and Caribbean immigrants in the US.

Music

Many cultural events in Jamaica are also observed by Jamaican Americans in local public celebrations or in the privacy of their homes.

Many Jamaican Americans have also been very influential and successful in Hip hop music. DJ kool Herc is credited with inventing rap/hip hop music and is known as the "founding father of Hiphop". Other famous rappers and DJ's such as Busta Rhymes, The Notorious B.I.G., Special Ed, Pete Rock, Canibus, Heavy D, Joey Bada$$, Slick Rick, and Bushwick Bill are all of Jamaican heritage.

Dances and songs
Jamaica's most popular musical forms are reggae and dancehall. There are also others such as "dub poetry" or chanted verses, Ska and Rocksteady, with its emotionally charged, celebrative beat. Jamaican Americans also listen to a great variety of other music such as: jazz, calypso, soca, rap, classical music, gospel and "high-church" choirs.

Actors

Notable Jamaican-American actors include Jada Pinkett Smith, Kerry Washington, Sheryl Lee Ralph and Harry Belafonte.

Cuisine

In Miami and Brooklyn, especially in the neighborhood of Flatbush along Flatbush, Nostrand, Utica and Church Avenues, one sees groceries filled with a variety of Caribbean cuisines, including sugar cane, jelly, coconut and yams.

Traditional costumes

In New York City, Jamaican Americans participate in the Caribbean Labor day parade in Brooklyn annually and dress in lavish and colorful costumes during the Brooklyn celebration along Eastern Parkway.

Sports

A number of Jamaican Americans have excelled in international competition and carried home many trophies. Donald Quarrie won the 200 and the 4 × 100 meters relay Olympic Gold Medal. Merlene Ottey won the 200 and the 4 × 100 meters relay. George Headley, who was born in Panama in 1909, transported to Cuba, grew up in Jamaica. and lived in the United States. Sanya Richards-Ross won gold in the 400 metres after finishing third at the 2008 Summer Olympics. Richards-Ross has also won Olympic gold in the 4×400 meters relay at the 2004 Summer Olympics, the 2008 Summer Olympics, and the 2012 Summer Olympics. She was the best 400m runner in the world for a decade, ranking No. 1 in the world from 2005-2009 and again in 2012.

Several Jamaican-Americans, including Jeff Cunningham, Robin Fraser, and Mark Chung have played for the United States national soccer team.

There have also been many Jamaican-American NBA players including Patrick Ewing, Ben Gordon, Andre Drummond, Roy Hibbert, Andrew Kennedy, and Omari Johnson.
 
Notable Jamaican-American NFL football players includes Patrick Chung, Atari Bigby, Nevin Lawson, Orlando Franklin, Kenrick Ellis, Ryan McBean and Laken Tomlinson.

There are also several Jamaican-American world-renowned boxers including boxing greats Mike Tyson and Floyd Mayweather Jr.

Politics 

Jamaicans have been involved in American political issues since the 1800s. John B. Russwurm fought against slavery and co-founded America's first black press, Freedom's Journal, in 1827. Ferdinand Smith co-founded the National Maritime Union and was considered one of the most powerful black labor leaders in U.S. history. Marcus Garvey became one of the most influential activists during the 1920s and 30s and it was Garvey's ideas that had a profound influence on the views of American civil rights leader, Martin Luther King. Some academics and experts claim Garvey "helped paved the way" for the American civil rights movement.

Renowned Jamaican-Americans from this group include former Secretary of State and four star general Colin Powell, Vice President Kamala Harris, former National Security adviser Susan Rice, "Mother of the Pell Grant" Lois Rice, former Governor of New York David Paterson, and lieutenant governor of Virginia Winsome Sears.

Science and technology 
Walt W. Braithwaite helped transform the field of aerospace design, driving the development of computer-aided design/computer-aided manufacturing (CAD/CAM) systems at Boeing. Braithwaite also made a significant contribution to the development of the Initial Graphics Exchange Specification (IGES). Braithwaite's common data format and translators from Boeing were subsequently used as the basis for developing the IGES protocol.

Yvette Francis-McBarnette was a pioneering paediatrician who was the first to use prophylactic antibiotics in the treatment of children with sickle cell.

Karen E. Nelson published the first ever comprehensive human microbiome study.

Paul S Ramphal is Adjunct Assistant Professor of Surgery at the University of North Carolina and inventor of the (Ramphal) Cardiac Surgery Simulator. The Ramphal Simulator is used in the training of many cardiothoracic surgery residents in the United States.

Robert Rashford co-invented the world's first portable 3D non-destructive evaluation (NDE) system. The system was used in the maintenance of the United States Government's Hubble Space Telescope. He also invented a protective enclosure for use transporting orbital replacement units (orus). Rashford designed and developed unique spacecraft support systems for the Upper Atmosphere Research Satellite (UARS) Airborne Support Equipment (UASE) at the Orbital Sciences Corporation (OSC). At General Electric, he designed and tested a variety of spacecraft for both commercial and military applications. At Bechtel Corporation, he designed a nuclear reactor support structure. He has designed numerous highly complex engineering systems that successfully flew on board NASA's Manned Space Flight Programs.

Mercedes Richards was a pioneering scientist who was the first astronomer to make images of the gravitational flow of gas between the stars in any interacting binary; the first to image the chromospheres and accretion disks in Algol binaries; the first in astronomy to apply the technique of tomography; the first astrophysicist to make theoretical hydrodynamic simulations of the Algol binary stars; the first astronomer to discover starspots on the cool star in an Algol binary and the first astrophysicist to apply novel distance correlation statistical methods to large astronomical databases.

John Henry Thompson, who studied and worked in the US, invented the Lingo programming language used in Adobe Director. The language is used for animation, web design, graphics, sound and video games.

Notable people

See also

West Indian Americans
African Americans
Jamaican Canadians
Jamaican British
Caribbean immigration to New York City
Jamaica–United States relations

References

Further reading
 Bishop, Jacqueline. My mother who is me: life stories from Jamaican women in New York (Africa World Press, 2006).
 Ferguson, Gail M., and Marc H. Bornstein. "Remote acculturation: The 'Americanization' of Jamaican islanders." International Journal of Behavioral Development 36.3 (2012): 167-177. Online
 Horst, Heather A., and Andrew Garner. Jamaican Americans (Chelsea House, 2007).
 Kasinitz, Philip, Juan Battle, and Ines Miyares. "Fade to black." in Ethnicities: Children of immigrant America ed by Rubén G. Rumbaut and Alejandro Portes.  (2001): 267-300.
 Murell, N. Samuel. "Jamaican Americans." in Gale Encyclopedia of Multicultural America, edited by Thomas Riggs, (3rd ed., vol. 2, Gale, 2014), pp. 523-536. Online

Caribbean American
 
 
Jamaican
American people of Jamaican descent